J. Roland Smith (born February 26, 1933) is an American politician who served in the South Carolina House of Representatives. A native of Aiken, South Carolina, Smith is a former Pentecostal minister and postman.

He serves the 84th District as a Republican, initially elected in 1989. He is a former chairman of the South Carolina House Ethics Committee, having held the position in during an investigation of governor Nikki Haley in 2012. He announced his retirement on December 30, 2013.

Smith is married to Peggy Cato, whom he married in 1953. They have three children, Garry, Todd and Caroline. His son, Garry has served in the House of Representatives since 2003, also a Republican. He lives in Warrenville, South Carolina.

References

1933 births
Living people
Republican Party members of the South Carolina House of Representatives
People from Aiken, South Carolina
American clergy
People from Aiken County, South Carolina
20th-century American politicians
21st-century American politicians